Marron Glacê is a Brazilian telenovela produced and broadcast by TV Globo. It premiered on 6 August 1979 and ended on 29 February 1980, with a total of 181 episodes. It's the twenty fourth "novela das sete" to be aired at the timeslot. It is created by  Cassiano Gabus Mendes.

Cast

References

External links 
 

1979 telenovelas
Brazilian telenovelas
TV Globo telenovelas
1979 Brazilian television series debuts
1980 Brazilian television series endings
Portuguese-language telenovelas